Stephen James Simpson    (born 26 June 1957) is the executive director of Obesity Australia and the academic director of the Charles Perkins Centre.

Born in Australia, he graduated with a BSc from the University of Queensland in 1978, and completed his PhD at King's College London in 1982 on locust feeding physiology. He spent 22 years in Oxford, in Experimental Psychology, the Department of Zoology, and the University Museum of Natural History, before returning to Australia in 2005, in the School of Biological Sciences at Sydney University.

Awards and honors

Simpson was elected a Fellow of the Australian Academy of Science in 2007. In 2009, he was awarded an Australian Laureate Fellowship. He was awarded the Wigglesworth Medal of the Royal Entomological Society in 2011 and was made a Companion of the Order of Australia in 2015. He was elected a Fellow of the Royal Society in 2013 and of the Royal Society of New South Wales in 2015. Simpson was awarded the Macfarlane Burnet Medal and Lecture by the Australian Academy of Science in 2022.

References

External links 
 Professor Stephen Simpson University of Sydney

1957 births
Living people
University of Queensland alumni
Alumni of King's College London
Academics of the University of Oxford
Academic staff of the University of Sydney
Fellows of the Royal Society
Fellows of the Australian Academy of Science
Companions of the Order of Australia
Fellows of Linacre College, Oxford
Fellows of Jesus College, Oxford